A camera module is an image sensor integrated with a lens, control electronics, and an interface like CSI, Ethernet or plain raw low-voltage differential signaling.

See also
 IP camera
 Mobile Industry Processor Interface (MIPI)
 Elphel - multi-sensor camera based on FPGA and Ethernet interface. Previous camera models were used with Google Books and street view

Computing input devices
Digital photography
Image sensors
Video